The 1992–93 UEFA Champions League was the 38th European Cup, the premier European club football tournament, and the first season with the UEFA Champions League branding (originally adopted only in the group stage).

It was the second season of the competition in which the eight second round winners would be split into two groups, with the winner of each one meeting in the final. In addition, a preliminary round was required as this was the first season after the break-up of the Soviet Union and Yugoslavia, resulting in many new countries eligible to enter the champions of their own leagues into the competition. Israel and the Faroe Islands were also represented for the first time.

The tournament was won for the first time by Marseille, defeating Milan in the final, becoming the first and as of 2022 only French team to win the European Cup/Champions League.

However, soon after Marseille's victory allegations of match fixing were levelled at them and their president Bernard Tapie. This involved a league game that took place 6 days before the final where Marseille, it emerged, had fixed their title-clinching Division 1 game against Valenciennes so they could concentrate on the Final against Milan. It is believed that Tapie bribed Valenciennes to lose so that Marseille would win the French league earlier, and above all that they would not injure the Marseille players before the Final against Milan. Before the 1991 European Cup final against the Red Star Belgrade, Marseille had a few injured players, Tapie did not want to repeat this mistake. This resulted in Marseille being stripped of their league title by the French Football Federation (although not the European Cup, as the match in question was not in that competition). They were banned from defending their European title in the 1993–94 season, and contesting the Intercontinental Cup and Super Cup. During the 1995 trial over Marseille's financial accounts, it was revealed that they had an annual budget of Fr5 million (about €760,000) dedicated to the purchase of matches from 1989 to 1993. The UEFA, along with the French Federation (FFF) and France authorities, investigated several Marseille matches during the 1992-1993 season. These investigations have not established any formal proof concerning alleged match-fixing in the Champions League. Therefore, Marseille's status as 1993 European champion was not affected. Barcelona, the defending champions, were eliminated in the second round by CSKA Moscow.

Teams

Preliminary round

First round

Second round

Group stage

The group stage began on 25 November 1992 and ended on 21 April 1993. The eight teams were divided into two groups of four, and the teams in each group played against each other on a home-and-away basis, meaning that each team played a total of six group matches. For each win, teams were awarded two points, with one point awarded for each draw. At the end of the group stage, the first team in each group advanced to the final.

Group A

Group B

Final

Top goalscorers
The top scorers from the 1992–93 UEFA Champions League (excluding preliminary round) are as follows:

See also
1992–93 European Cup Winners' Cup
1992–93 UEFA Cup

Notes

References

External links

1992–93 All matches – season at UEFA website
European Cup results at Rec.Sport.Soccer Statistics Foundation
 All scorers 1992–93 UEFA Champions League (excluding preliminary round) according to protocols UEFA + all scorers preliminary round
 1992/93 UEFA Champions League – results and line-ups (archive)

 
1
UEFA Champions League seasons